The Dorset County Cricket Club was established in February 1896. Since then, it has played minor counties cricket since 1897 and played List A cricket from 1968 to 2004, using a different number of home grounds during that time. Their first minor counties fixture in 1897 was against Wiltshire at the Recreation Ground, Blandford Forum, while their first List A match came 71 years later against Bedfordshire in the 1968 Gillette Cup at Sherborne School. The club is based at Dean Park, Bournemouth, which also held first-class and List A cricket for Hampshire from 1897 to 1992.

The seventeen grounds that Dorset have used for home matches since 1897 are listed below, with statistics complete through to the end of the 2012 season.

Grounds

List A
Below is a complete list of grounds used by Dorset County Cricket Club when it was permitted to play List A matches. These grounds have also held Minor Counties Championship and MCCA Knockout Trophy matches.

Minor Counties
Below is a complete list of grounds used by the Dorset County Cricket Club in Minor Counties Championship and MCCA Knockout Trophy matches.

Notes

References

Dorset County Cricket Club
Cricket grounds in Dorset
Dorset